Nicholas Okongo Okoth (born 3 March 1983) is a Kenyan amateur boxer. He fought at the 2008 Olympics as a featherweight after winning the 2nd AIBA African 2008 Olympic Qualifying Tournament.

In Beijing he lost his debut to Arturo Santos Reyes.

Okoth grew up in the Mathare slums of Nairobi with three brothers who would also become boxers. The four of them, along with a cousin, trained at Undugu Amateur Boxing Club.

He qualified to represent Kenya at the 2020 Summer Olympics.

References

External links
Qualifier
sports-reference

Living people
Featherweight boxers
Boxers at the 2008 Summer Olympics
Olympic boxers of Kenya
1983 births
Kenyan male boxers
Boxers at the 2010 Commonwealth Games
Commonwealth Games medallists in boxing
Commonwealth Games bronze medallists for Kenya
African Games bronze medalists for Kenya
African Games medalists in boxing
Competitors at the 2015 African Games
Sportspeople from Nairobi
Boxers at the 2020 Summer Olympics
Boxers at the 2022 Commonwealth Games
Medallists at the 2010 Commonwealth Games